AIK had a disappointing season, where the team did not win a single match in the wake of the sale of Brazilian star Wílton Figueiredo, dropping out of the title chase, missing European qualification in the process. Argentine recruits Iván Obolo and Lucas Valdemarín impressed upon their arrivals, forming an impressive unit with Figueiredo, which was curtailed when Al-Rayyan bought Figueiredo in September. The defense was arguably AIK's greatest asset, conceding just 28 goals, led by keeper Daniel Örlund and new talisman Nils-Eric Johansson.

Season events
Prior to the start of the season, AIK announced the signings of Per Rønning, Patrik Karlsson, Alexander Gerndt and Niklas Westberg. Rønning and Karlsson both signed three-year contracts, whilst Nicklas Bergh joined Enköpings SK on loan for the season when Westberg signed.

On 11 January, AIK and venture capital company Agent 03, announced the signings of Khari Stephenson from GAIS to a four-year contract.

On 19 January, Wílton Figueiredo signed a new contract with AIK until the end of 2009.

On 21 May, AIK announced the signing of Nils-Eric Johansson on a free transfer from Leicester City, commencing 1 July, on a three-year contract.

On 26 June, AIK and venture capital company Agent 03, announced the signings of Iván Obolo and Lucas Valdemarín from Arsenal de Sarandí to three-year contracts commencing 1 July.

Squad

Transfers

In

Out

Loans out

Released

Trial

Friendlies

Competitions

Overview

Allsvenskan

League table

Results summary

Results by matchday

Results

Svenska Cupen

UEFA Cup

Squad statistics

Appearances and goals

|-
|colspan="14"|Players away on loan:

|-
|colspan="14"|Players who appeared for AIK but left during the season:

|}

Goal scorers

Clean sheets

Disciplinary record

References

AIK Fotboll seasons
AIK